Li Zhouzhe (1944 — 2002) was a Chinese footballer who played as a right winger.

Playing career
In 1964, Li began his senior career with the Air Force Football Team.

In 1969, Li's performances led to him being called-up for China. Li played in both the 1974 Asian Games and the 1976 AFC Asian Cup, scoring a hat-trick against Brunei in a 10–1 victory whilst qualifying for the latter tournament on 19 June 1975.

Managerial career
In 1977, following his retirement from football a year prior, Li began coaching at Bayi, managing the first team, second team and youth teams for a period of 18 years. 

In December 1996, Li was appointed head coach of newly formed club . On 13 May 1997, Li was sacked from Harbin Lange due to poor results.

References

1944 births
2002 deaths
People from Jixi
Footballers from Heilongjiang
Association football wingers
Chinese footballers
China international footballers
Footballers at the 1974 Asian Games
1976 AFC Asian Cup players
Chinese football managers
Chinese people of Korean descent
Asian Games competitors for China